John James Akpan Udo-Edehe  was elected Senator for the Akwa Ibom North East District of Akwa Ibom State, Nigeria at the start of the Nigerian Fourth Republic, running on the People's Democratic Party (PDP) platform. He took office on 29 May 1999.

Background

Akpan Udo-Edehe was born on 9 November 1963 in Afaha Offot, Uyo Local Government Area of Akwa Ibom State. 
He studied at Holy Trinity College, Mbiakong, in Uruan LGA (1975–1979), and in 1990 was admitted to the University of Uyo, where he studied Sociology/Anthropology. Later he studied for an M.Sc in Sociology of Development at the University of Calabar, graduating in 2006.
He started work in 1980 as Sales Manager/Personal Assistant to the Chairman of Dajucom Nigeria. He became Managing Director/Executive Chairman of John Silver Nigeria Limited in 1987.

Political career

Udo-Edehe was elected Chairman of the Uyo Local Government and then chairman of Uyo Council with the full support of Mr. Inyang Udoh before being
elected to the Senate in 1999. 
His administration was probed by the  Akwa Ibom Military Administrator, Navy Captain Joseph Adeusi.  
In 1997, he won election as Senator for Uyo during the attempted return to democracy under General Sani Abacha. In 1999, he again ran for the Uyo Senatorial District on the People's Democratic Party (PDP) platform, and was elected. He held office until May 2003.
After taking his seat in the Senate Udo-Edehe was appointed to committees on Industry, Labour, Finance & Appropriation, Internal Affairs, Information, Privatization (chairman) and Government Affairs.

Udo-Edehe was Vice Chairman of the Campaign Organisation for election of Obong Victor Attah as Governor of Akwa Ibom State in 2003. 
He was chairman of Godswill Akpabio's successful campaign for Akwa Ibom governorship in 2006/2007.
He was appointed Minister of State for the Federal Capital Territory (FCT) by President Umaru Yar'Adua on 26 July 2007.
His Senate screening managed to pass despite opposition from party leaders in his state. 
He was relieved of his position on 29 October 2008 in a major cabinet shake-up.

In 2010, he started a campaign to become the 2011 PDP candidate for governor of Akwa Ibom State.
The Akwa Ibom Democratic Voice, a group led by Annang people loyal to the incumbent Governor Akpabio tried to prevent his political campaign in the Ikot Ekpene Senatorial District, pulling down his posters.
In June 2010, a former Governor of Akwa Ibom State, Obong Victor Attah, endorsed Udoedehe as candidate, saying Akwa Ibom had become a failed state under Akpabio's administration.
In 2015 Senator Udoedehe re-ran for the gubernatorial election but was defeated by Obong Umana Okon Umana, in the primaries election.
After another defeat in 2018 at primaries, in March 2020 Sen.John.J. Udoedehe, was issued an appointment as Board member Nigerian Ports Authority.

References

Federal ministers of Nigeria
1960 births
Living people
People from Uyo
Peoples Democratic Party members of the Senate (Nigeria)
University of Uyo alumni
University of Calabar alumni
Akwa Ibom State politicians
20th-century Nigerian politicians
21st-century Nigerian politicians